Golden Time is a 2012  South Korean television series starring Lee Sun-kyun, Hwang Jung-eum, Lee Sung-min and Song Seon-mi. It aired on MBC from July 9 to September 25, 2012 on Mondays and Tuesdays at 21:55 for 23 episodes.

In emergency medicine, "golden time" or "golden hour" refers to the crucial time period right after a patient suffers a traumatic injury, during which timely medical treatment could determine life or death.

Plot
After spending two years teaching in the country, Lee Min-woo (Lee Sun-kyun) returns to a city hospital to complete his residency and face his own uncertainties about being a doctor. Free-spirited and goofy, he is jaded about his job and just wants it easy. He is then jolted out of apathy when a traumatic incident forces him to rethink why he wanted to be a doctor in the first place. First-year resident Kang Jae-in (Hwang Jung-eum) comes from a rich family that owns hospitals, but she just simply wants to be a doctor who can support herself and help others. Both Min-woo and Jae-in work in ER under the guidance of Choi In-hyuk (Lee Sung-min), a famously astute workaholic surgeon who puts his patients before himself.

Cast

Main characters
Lee Sun-kyun as Lee Min-woo
Hwang Jung-eum as Kang Jae-in
Lee Sung-min as Choi In-hyuk
Song Seon-mi as veteran nurse Shin Eun-ah

Supporting characters

Jae-in's family
Jang Yong as Kang Dae-je, Jae-in's grandfather
Sunwoo Yong-nyeo as Park Geum-nyeo, Jae-in's grandmother
Song Yoo-ha as Bang Seon-woo
Kim Jong-rae as Dae-je's younger brother

Department of Emergency Medicine
Jung Kyu-soo as Na Byung-gook 
Kim Ki-bang as Kim Do-hyeong

Department of Orthopedics
Lee Ki-young as Hwang Se-han 
Jo Sang-ki as Park Seong-jin 
Heo Tae-hee as Go Jae-won 
Ji Il-joo as Yoo Kang-jin

Department of Neurosurgery
Kim Hyung-il as Kim Ho-young 
Shin Dong-mi as Jo Dong-mi

Department of General Surgery
Um Hyo-sup as Kim Min-joon
Hong Ji-min as Song Kyeong-hwa

Department of Anesthesiology
Jung Seok-yong as Ji Han-goo

Department of Plastic Surgery
Chun Jae-ho as Park Geun-soo

Department of Trauma Surgery
Kim Sa-kwon as Jang Hyuk-chan

Extended cast
Kim Mi-kyung as Min-woo's mother
Park Young-ji as Oh Gwang-cheol, hospital director
Park Jeong-min as Jang Young-woo 
Ban Hye-ra as Kang Soo-kyung
Ga Deuk-hee as Seo Hyo-eun
Na Seung-ho as Kang Dae-je's secretary
Seo Ji-yeon as nurse
Gong Soo-hyuk as association member
Choi Jae-sub as Park Won-gook
Hong Hyun-taek as Lee Se-min
Lee Dong-gyu as Shin Eun-ah's fiancé
Im Ji-young as woman in childbed
Yoon Min-soo as mass production member
Song Young-kyu as Lee Won-pyo
Jung Ae-yeon as Bang Hee-sun
Lee Seok-gu as Choi Jun-bae

Background
The series was praised for its verisimilitude and social commentary on the country's lack of trauma centers. The character of trauma specialist Choi In-hyuk was based on real-life doctor Lee Guk-jong, who became famous in 2011 when he saved the life of Captain Seok Hae-kyun after Seok received multiple gunshot wounds during a rescue mission from Somali pirates.

Ratings
With a rise of 5.1 percent in the third week of July 2012, Golden Time landed its first win on the Monday and Tuesday primetime ratings chart after drawing in 12.6 percent of the total viewers, according to data compiled by the TNmS (Total National Multimedia Statistics). The series, which had been struggling at the bottom for its first two weeks with single-digit ratings, made this leap as the former chart-topper The Chaser and runner-up Big wrapped up their runs. With average ratings of 13.3-15.5 percent, it thereafter topped its timeslot for ten consecutive weeks, despite the rival channels' London Olympics 2012 coverage and the premieres of Faith and Haeundae Lovers.

Originally slated at 20 episodes, it was given a 3-episode extension, and discussions are underway for a possible second season.

Soundtrack
This was director Kwon Seok-jang's third collaboration with music director Moon Sung-nam, after Pasta (2010) and My Princess (2011). The soundtrack features songs by indie musicians 10cm, Verbal Jint and Every Single Day. It was released by WinOne Entertainment and LOEN Entertainment.

 모래시계 (Hourglass) - Every Single Day
 어느날 (One Day) - 10cm
 두 뺨에 닿기전에 (Before It Touches Both of My Cheeks) - Byul
 오아시스 (Oasis) - Pia & Zico (of Block B)
 약한사람 (Weak Person) - Verbal Jint feat. Heo In-chang
 해주고 싶은 말 (Words I Want to Tell You) - Melody Day feat. MC Jinri & Zeenan
 I Miss You - Yoon Gun
 너를 되뇌다 (Piano ver.) - Son Seung-yeon feat. Romantisco
 그댄 아나요 (Do You Know?) - Scenery with Riding Bicycle feat. Lee Ji-min and Kim Yoo-jin (of W.H.O)
 Father - Every Single Day
 사랑아 가지마 (Love, Don't Go) - Islander
 I'm in Love With U - Yisun
 Deep in My Heart - In a Band
 Cold - Every Single Day
 너를 되뇌다 - Son Seung-yeon feat. Romantisco
 어느날 (One Day) (Unplugged ver.) - 10cm
 오아시스 (Oasis) (Acoustic ver.) - Pia & Zico (of Block B)

Awards and nominations

International broadcast
 It aired in Vietnam on SCTV phim tổng hợp, beginning October 7, 2013.

References

External links
Golden Time official MBC website 
Golden Time at MBC Global Media

MBC TV television dramas
2012 South Korean television series debuts
2012 South Korean television series endings
Korean-language television shows
South Korean medical television series
Television shows set in Busan